Azidan Sarudin (born 31 May 1986, in Kuala Lumpur) is a Malaysian footballer who plays for Harini F.C. in the Malaysia M3 League as a central midfielder.

Honours

Club
 Malaysia Cup: 2
 Winners (2): 2013, 2014
 FA Cup: 1
 Winners (1): 2014
 Sultan Haji Ahmad Shah Cup: 1
 Winners (1): 2014

References

External links
 Azidan senjata utama Tok Gajah
 Azidan: Elak buat silap
 Pahang to go all out against JDT in semi-final showdown
 Lapan pemain Pahang rebut empat kekosongan
 
 Azidan tekad rebut kesebelsan utama

1986 births
Living people
Malaysian footballers
Sri Pahang FC players
Penang F.C. players
Selangor FA players
Kuala Lumpur City F.C. players
Sportspeople from Kuala Lumpur
Malaysia Super League players
Association football midfielders
Malaysian people of Malay descent